The Illiana Motor Speedway is a closed race track located in Schererville, Indiana, United States and was built in 1947. It was announced on March 11, 2016 that the track would not open for the 2016 season. The track has been sold to the Town of Schererville.

History 
When the track opened, in 1947, it was a 1/2-mile dirt track. In 1964 the track was paved. Today the track is a 1/2-mile asphalt oval with an inner 1/4 mile. During the 1962 season the track's owner Harry Molenaar created a season-ending 100-lap race called the "Tony Bettenhausen Memorial" dedicated to the memory of former open wheel Indy car and local racer Tony Bettenhausen who died a year earlier in a racing accident. In 2000 the speedway was repaved for the first time in nearly 40 years and current owner Mike Mikuly bought the track and also installed cement walls to replace the old guard rails. In 2000 the Turbo Stox division was introduced with great success racing on Illiana's 1/4 mile. 2001 was also the last year for the Street Stock division at Illiana. For the 2003 season track owner Mike Mikuly decided to add a  Limited Late Model division to Illiana Motor Speedway's racing card, bringing the track's number of racing divisions to four. The Limited Late Models run a crate (spec) engine. The crate engine is considered to be a lot cheaper to race than the engines used in the Super Late Model division. In 2004 track owner Mike Mikuly decided again to add another division to Illiana's weekly racing program; 4-cylinder Pure Stocks and would race on the tracks 1/4 mile. Illiana added the Legend cars to the weekly program in 2007. They race on the 1/4 mile. On June 24, 2016 the town of schererville announced it had purchased the track and would begin demolition of the speedway.

Notable drivers
Bobby Wawak, 1974 Late Model champion, ran NASCAR for many years
Larry Schuler, 1976 Late Model champion, winningest driver in the nation in 1976
Bobby Dotter, 1981 Late Model champion, NASCAR Busch Series race winner
Brett Sontag, 2004 ASA National Tour Rookie of the Year

References

External links
Official Site

Motorsport venues in Indiana
Buildings and structures in Lake County, Indiana
Tourist attractions in Lake County, Indiana
Defunct motorsport venues in the United States
2016 disestablishments in Indiana
1947 establishments in Indiana